Vladimír Zlínský (born 29 May, 1964) is a Czech politician and physician and a member of the Chamber of Deputies for the Freedom and Direct Democracy party.

Biography
Zlínský studied medicine at Masaryk University before working as a physician specialising in otorhinolaryngology. He worked at hospitals in  Zlín, Kroměříž and Uherské Hradiště, before running a private clinic in Otrokovice. In the municipal elections in 2020, he was elected a representative of the city of Zlín for the Freedom and Direct Democracy movement. During the 2021 Czech legislative election, he was elected to the Chamber of Deputies.

References 

1964 births
Living people
Czech physicians
21st-century Czech politicians
Freedom and Direct Democracy MPs
Members of the Chamber of Deputies of the Czech Republic (2021–2025)
Politicians from Zlín
Masaryk University alumni